The Ross was a Brass era  automobile manufactured in Detroit, Michigan from 1915 to 1918 by the Ross Automobile Company.

History 
John L. Ross of Ross & Young Machine Company entered the automobile field by incorporating his Ross Automobile Company in 1915.  The Ross automobile had a Herschell-Spillman V-8 engine with body styles including sedans and town cars and were priced at $1,350 and $1,850, .

The "Ross Eight" won fame briefly in 1916 for being the first automobile to climb San Francisco's famous Fillmore Street hill in high gear, where grades reach a maximum of 25%.

New York capitalists took over the company in late 1916 and changed the car from an 8-cylinder to a Continental six-cylinder.  In 1917 the V-8 engine was reinstated, but not for long. The Company entered receivership and in February 1918, the Ross plant had been sold.

References

American companies established in 1915
Defunct motor vehicle manufacturers of the United States
Defunct manufacturing companies based in Detroit
Motor vehicle manufacturers based in Michigan
Vehicle manufacturing companies established in 1915
Vehicle manufacturing companies disestablished in 1918
1915 establishments in Michigan
1918 disestablishments in Michigan
Brass Era vehicles
1910s cars
Cars introduced in 1915